Neocollyris labiopalpalis is a species of ground beetle in the genus Neocollyris in the family Carabidae. It was described by Horn in 1932.

References

Labiopalpalis, Neocollyris
Beetles described in 1932